Stikal Peak is a rocky peak that is 1835 m in Owen Ridge, the southernmost portion of Sentinel Range in Ellsworth Mountains, Antarctica.  It surmounts lower Nimitz Glacier to the southwest and Wessbecher Glacier to the northeast.

The peak is named after the settlement of Stikal in Southern Bulgaria.

Location
US mapping in 1961 and 1988.

Maps
 Vinson Massif.  Scale 1:250 000 topographic map.  Reston, Virginia: US Geological Survey, 1988.
 Antarctic Digital Database (ADD). Scale 1:250000 topographic map of Antarctica. Scientific Committee on Antarctic Research (SCAR). Since 1993, regularly updated.

Notes

References
 Stikal Peak. SCAR Composite Gazetteer of Antarctica.
 Bulgarian Antarctic Gazetteer. Antarctic Place-names Commission. (details in Bulgarian, basic data in English)

External links
 Stikal Peak. Copernix satellite image

Ellsworth Mountains
Bulgaria and the Antarctic
Mountains of Ellsworth Land